I Am Ozzy is the autobiography of Ozzy Osbourne, vocalist of Black Sabbath and solo singer. It chronicles his life, beginning as a child, followed by his career as a vocalist. The book was widely praised by its readers for its level of detail, and humour. It currently holds a 4.8/5 rating on Amazon.com.

The book was co-written by Chris Ayres, due to Osbourne's dyslexia. The audio book was read by Frank Skinner.

Reception
In 2010, Osbourne won the "Literary Achievement" honour for his memoir, I Am Ozzy, at the Guys Choice Awards at Sony Pictures Studio in Culver City, California. Osbourne was presented with the award by Sir Ben Kingsley. The book debuted at No. 2 on the New York Times' hardcover non-fiction best-seller list. The book holds a 4.07 rating of 5 on goodreads.com.

References

British autobiographies
Black Sabbath
2010 non-fiction books
Ozzy Osbourne
Music autobiographies
Heavy metal publications